The Battle of Loos took place from  1915 in France on the Western Front, during the First World War. It was the biggest British attack of 1915, the first time that the British used poison gas and the first mass engagement of New Army units. The French and British tried to break through the German defences in Artois and Champagne and restore a war of movement. Despite improved methods, more ammunition and better equipment, the Franco-British attacks were largely contained by the Germans, except for local losses of ground. The British gas attack failed to neutralize the defenders and the artillery bombardment was too short to destroy the barbed wire or machine gun nests. German tactical defensive proficiency was still dramatically superior to the British offensive planning and doctrine, resulting in a British defeat.

Background

Strategic developments
Field Marshal Sir John French and Douglas Haig (GOC First Army), regarded the ground south of La Bassée Canal, which was overlooked by German-held slag heaps and colliery towers, as unsuitable for an attack, particularly given the discovery in July that the Germans were building a second defensive position behind the front position. At the Frévent Conference on 27 July, Field Marshal French failed to persuade Ferdinand Foch that an attack further north offered greater prospects for success. The debate continued into August, with Joffre siding with Foch and the British commanders being over-ruled by Herbert Kitchener, the British Secretary of State for War, on 21 August. On 3 May, the British had decided to use poison gas in military operations in France. At a conference on 6 September, Haig announced to his subordinates that extensive use of chlorine gas might facilitate an advance on a line towards Douai and Valenciennes, despite the terrain, as long as the French and British were able to keep the attack secret.

Prelude

British offensive preparations
The battle was the third time that specialist Royal Engineer tunnelling companies were used to dig under no-man's-land, to plant mines under the parapets of the German front line trenches, ready to be detonated at zero hour.

British plan

French decided to keep a reserve consisting of the Cavalry Corps, the Indian Cavalry Corps and XI Corps (Lieutenant-General Richard Haking), which consisted of the Guards Division and the New Army 21st Division and 24th Division, recently arrived in France and a corps staff (some of whom had never worked together or served on a staff before). Archibald Murray, the Deputy Chief of the Imperial General Staff (DCIGS) advised French that as troops fresh from training, they were suited for the long marches of an exploitation rather than for trench warfare. French was doubtful that a breakthrough would be achieved.

Haig was hampered by the shortage of artillery ammunition, which meant the preliminary bombardment, essential for success in trench warfare, was insufficient. With only 533 guns and a shortage of shells to cover  front with two German trench lines to bombard, the British would probably be attacking positions that had not been disrupted enough to cause a breakthrough and reliant on the success of the gas attack. The British commanders at this time did not grasp that German defensive tactics included placing the second line of machine gun nests on the reverse slopes of hills; destroying them would need howitzers and shells with high explosives. Due to the inefficiency of contemporary gas masks, many soldiers removed them as they could not see through the fogged-up eyepieces or could barely breathe with them on, which led to some being affected by their own gas. Wanting to be closer to the battle, French had moved to a forward command post at Lilliers, less than  behind the First Army front.

Battle

25 September

In many places British artillery had failed to cut the German wire before the attack. The engineers manning the poison gas cylinders warned against their use, because of the weakness and unpredictability of the wind but they were overruled by General Sir Hubert Gough. In some places the gas drifted back into the British lines and caused more British than German casualties. Advancing over open fields, within range of German machine guns and artillery, the British infantry suffered many casualties. The British were able to break through the weaker German defences and capture the village of Loos-en-Gohelle, mainly due to numerical superiority. Supply and communications problems, combined with the late arrival of reserves, meant that the breakthrough could not be exploited. Haig did not hear until  that the divisions were moving up to the front. French had not understood the poorness of the roads these reserves would be using and had not constructed new ones. Much of the reserves divisions had to march most of the day and night single file up the only accessible roads.

26–28 September
When the battle resumed the following day, the Germans had recovered and improved their defensive positions. British attempts to continue the advance with the reserves were repulsed. The British preparatory bombardment, which amounted to desultory fire for about twenty minutes, apparently inflicted no casualties. German machine gunners reported being "nauseated" from the sight of so many corpses and ceased firing so that the British could retreat with their wounded. French told Foch on 28 September, that a gap could be "rushed" just north of Hill 70, although Foch felt that this would be difficult to co-ordinate and Haig told him that the First Army was in no position for further attacks. A lull fell on 28 September, with the British back on their starting positions, having suffered more than  including three major-generals.

Air operations
The Royal Flying Corps (RFC) came under the command of Brigadier-General Hugh Trenchard. The  wings under Colonels Edward Ashmore, John Salmond and Sefton Brancker participated. As the British were short of artillery ammunition, the RFC flew target identification sorties prior to the battle, to ensure that shells were not wasted. During the first few days of the attack, target-marking squadrons equipped with better wireless transmitters, helped to direct British artillery onto German targets. Later in the battle, pilots carried out a tactical bombing operation for the first time in history. Aircraft of the  wings dropped many  bombs on German troops, trains, rail lines and marshalling yards. As the land offensive stalled, British pilots and observers flew low over German positions, providing target information to the artillery.

Aftermath

Analysis

Rawlinson wrote to the King's adviser Arthur Bigge (28 September)

Major-General Richard Hilton, at that time a Forward Observation Officer, said of the battle:

French had already been criticised before the battle and lost his remaining support in the government and army due to the British failure and a belief that he handled poorly the reserve divisions. French was replaced by Haig as Commander-in-Chief (C-in-C) of the British Expeditionary Force (BEF) in December 1915. Though Haig and Gough committed too many of their forces on the first day, they largely escaped blame for the debacle. French's combination of poor tactical planning, lack of knowledge of the conditions and poor execution in releasing the reserves was blamed for the British failure by John Keegan in 1998.

Casualties
In , the German official account, 6th Army casualties are given as  21 September; by the end of October losses had risen to  total German casualties for the autumn battle in Artois and Champagne, were given as  About 26,000 of the German casualties were attributable to the Battle of Loos.

54 Commonwealth Commanding Officers were killed or wounded in the battle.

Subsequent operations

3–13 October

The Germans made several attempts to recapture the Hohenzollern Redoubt, which they accomplished on 3 October. On 8 October, the Germans attempted to recapture much of the remaining lost ground by attacking with five regiments around Loos and against part of the 7th Division on the left flank. Foggy weather inhibited observation, the artillery preparation was inadequate and the British and French defenders were well prepared behind intact wire. The German attack was repulsed with  but managed to disrupt British attack preparations, causing a delay until the night of  The British made a final attack on 13 October, which failed due to a lack of hand grenades. Haig thought it might be possible to launch another attack on 7 November but the combination of heavy rain and accurate German shelling during the second half of October persuaded him to abandon the attempt.

Commemoration

The community of Loos in British Columbia, changed its name from Crescent Island to commemorate the battle and several participants wrote of their experiences, Robert Graves described the battle and succeeding days in his war memoir Good-Bye to All That (1929), Patrick MacGill, who served as a stretcher-bearer in the London Irish and was wounded at Loos in October 1915, described the battle in his autobiographical novel The Great Push (1916) and J. N. Hall related his experiences in the British Army at Loos in Kitchener's Mob (1916).

Victoria Cross awards

 Daniel Laidlaw, 7th (Service) Battalion, King's Own Scottish Borderers.
 Frederick Henry Johnson, 73rd Field Company, Corps of Royal Engineers, 15th Division.
 Harry Wells, 2nd Battalion Royal Sussex Regiment.
 Anketell Moutray Read, 1st Battalion, Northamptonshire Regiment (posthumous).
 Henry Edward Kenny, 1st Battalion, Loyal North Lancashire Regiment.
 George Stanley Peachment, 2nd Battalion, King's Royal Rifle Corps.
 Arthur Vickers, 2nd Battalion, Royal Warwickshire Regiment.
 George Maling, Royal Army Medical Corps.
 Kulbir Thapa, 2nd Battalion, 3rd Queen Alexandra's Own Gurkha Rifles.
 Rupert Price Hallowes, 4th Battalion, Middlesex Regiment.
 Angus Falconer Douglas-Hamilton, 6th (Service) Battalion, Queen's Own Cameron Highlanders.
 Arthur Frederick Saunders, 9th (Service) Battalion, Suffolk Regiment.
 Robert Dunsire, 13th (Service) Battalion, Royal Scots.
 James Dalgleish Pollock, 5th (Service) Battalion, Queen's Own Cameron Highlanders.
 Alexander Buller Turner, 3rd Battalion, Royal Berkshire Regiment (posthumous).
 Alfred Alexander Burt, 1/1st Battalion, Hertfordshire Regiment.
 Arthur Fleming-Sandes, 2nd Battalion, East Surrey Regiment.
 Samuel Harvey, 1st Battalion, York and Lancaster Regiment.
 Oliver Brooks, 3rd Battalion, Coldstream Guards.
 James Lennox Dawson, 187th Company, Corps of Royal Engineers.
 Geoffrey Vickers, Sherwood Foresters (Nottinghamshire and Derbyshire Regiment).

See also

 John Kipling - killed in action during Battle of Loos, September 1915
 Charles Sorley - killed in action during Battle of Loos, October 1915
 Friendly fire incidents of World War II

Notes

Footnotes

References

Books
 
 
 
 
 
 
 
 
 
 
 
 
 
 
 

Journals
 

Websites

Further reading

Books
 
 
 

Theses

External links

 Battle of Loos
 Battle of Loos
 Photograph collection
 CWGC: 1915: The Battle of Loos
 Recording 'Laidlaw's Last Lament' song by David Kilpatrick

Battles of World War I involving British India
Battles of World War I involving the United Kingdom
Battles of World War I involving Germany
Battles of the Western Front (World War I)
Loos
Conflicts in 1915
1915 in France
History of Nord (French department)
September 1915 events
October 1915 events
Friendly fire incidents of World War I
Military operations of World War I involving chemical weapons